Steve Southerland (born March 8, 1955) is a Republican member of the Tennessee Senate representing the 1st district, which encompasses Cocke County, Greene County, Hamblen County, and part of Sevier County.

Biography

Early life
Steve Southerland was born on March 8, 1955. He attended Walters State Community College. He became a mortgage broker.

Career
He was elected to the 103rd - 110th General Assemblies. He is Vice-Chair of the Senate Commerce, Labor and Agriculture Committee. He serves as a member of the Senate Transportation Committee, the Senate Environment, Conservation and Tourism Committee, the Senate Ethics Committee, and the Joint Fiscal Review Committee. He is currently the Senate Deputy Speaker, Republican Caucus Chaplain, and he has been appointed to the Financial Services Standing Committee of the National Conference on State Legislatures. In a March 2004 interview with The Tennessean, Steve Southerland stated that he is against abortion and he does not believe that civil unions and domestic partnerships should be allowed in Tennessee.

He is a member of the Morristown Area Chamber of Commerce, the Rotary Club and the National Rifle Association. He attends a Baptist church.

Personal life
He is married to Cheri Southerland, and they have two daughters, Mattea and Mara. He is not related to former U. S. Representative Steve Southerland.

References

Republican Party Tennessee state senators
Living people
1955 births
21st-century American politicians
Walters State Community College alumni